The Österlen Line is a  long railway line between Ystad and Simrishamn in Skåne County, Sweden. The line is the remains of two former lines, the Malmö–Simrishamn Line and the Ystad–Eslöv Line. The Österlen Line runs from Ystad Station, where it is a continuation of the Ystad Line. The line is single track and electrified. It is served by the Skåne Commuter Rail and freight trains.

History
The Österlen Line has historically been two lines: the Malmö–Simrishamn Line and the Ystad–Eslöv Line. The latter was opened in 1866 and was at the time the only railway connection to Ystad. It was connected the other way in 1874 with the opening of the Ystad Line. In 1882 the Simrishamn–Tomelilla Line opened and met the Ystad–Eslöv Line at Tomelilla. In 1893 the Malmö–Tomelilla Line opened, making Tomelilla a hub. Trains from Malmö to Simrishamn were marketed as the Bornholm Express, as they corresponded with the ferry to the Danish island of Bornholm. The various railways were nationalized in the early 1940s, and from the 1950 Y6 diesel railcars were introduced. In 1970, passenger transport from Malmö to Tomelilla was terminated and all passenger trains instead ran via Ystad. Freight transport from Eslöv to Tomelilla was closed in 1975 and in 1981 the passenger trains there were also terminated. In 1985, the SiTY Train was launched between Simrishamn, Tomelilla and Ystad, using Y1 diesel railcars. They were rebranded Österlenaren in the late 1990s.

After SJ in 1991 decided to terminate freight traffic on the section from Köpingebro to Simrishamn, the traffic was taken over by Österlentåg AB. The company filed for bankruptcy in 1994. Eventually Sydtåg started freight traffic, but it also had to fold. In 1996 the Ystad Line was electrified, allowing the Österlen Line to also be electrified. In 1997, Malmöhus County and Kristianstad County were merged to create Skåne County, resulting in the Skåne Commuter Rail being extended from Ystad to Simrishamn. Electrification started in 2001, resulting in the line being closed several summers. At the same time, the line received several upgrades. The electric traction was taken into use on 20 September 2003.

References

Railway lines in Sweden
Railway lines opened in 1866
Rail infrastructure in Skåne County
1866 establishments in Sweden